Bill or Billy Johnston may refer to:
 Bill Johnston (cricketer) (1922–2007), Australian cricketer
 Bill Johnston (golfer) (1925–2021), American golfer and golf course architect
 Bill Johnston (tennis) (1894–1946), American tennis champion
 Bill Johnston (rugby union) (born 1997), Irish rugby union player 
 Billy Johnston (footballer, born 1901) (1901–1964), Scottish football player
 Billy Johnston (footballer, born 1942), Irish football player and manager
 Bill Johnston (pirate) (1782–1870), Canadian pirate and patriot
 Bill Johnston (politician) (born 1962), member of the Western Australian Legislative Assembly
 Bill Johnston (translator) (born 1960), Polish language translator and professor

See also
 Bill Johnson (disambiguation)
 Billy Johnson (disambiguation)
 William Johnston (disambiguation)
 William Johnstone (disambiguation)